This is a list of characters from the Japanese anime series Zegapain, its spinoff games, Zegapain NOT and Zegapain XOR, and 10th anniversary compilation movie, Zegapain ADP.

Characters

Maihama Minami High School

Height: 176cm
Weight: 65kg
Version 2.0.1, Version 2.0.3
The protagonist, who discovers the world he lives in is an illusion and must fight to save the real world and protect the people who still live within the illusory world.  He is a talented pilot and serves as the Altair Zegapain's Gunner. Kyo is an enthusiastic person who gets good grades and loves to swim more than anything else, but can also be reckless and become easily frustrated when he finds he cannot understand what is happening around him. As the anime develops, he begins to develop feelings for Kaminagi and vows to protect her. He has no memories of his past life, which he only learns of from Shizuno. Near the ending after being reborn he remembers that he still loves Shizuno and Ryoko after having both memories of the first Kyo and himself.  He is also a playable character in Zegapain XOR.

Version 1.X.X
According to Shizuno, his past self was thoughtful and prudent and kept his emotional pain to himself. His character had been changed by wet damage before he met Shizuno such that his original character is actually closer to  Version 2.0.X.  Lu-Shen respected (or idolized) him, May-Yu and May-Yen both seem to have crushes on him, and Minato has never met him. His past self seemed to have had a relationship with his co pilot Shizuno until he had lost his memory having obtained too much wet damage after he had self-destructed himself in the battle for the moon server. He left messages for his future self to prevent himself from making the same mistakes and exhausting himself emotionally from the strain of being a Celebrant.

Height: 160cm
Weight: 46kg
Kyo's childhood friend, a cheerful girl who dreams of becoming a film director and is a member of the high school Video Club. She is perceptive and is the first of Kyo's friends to "awaken" to the real world with a much easier transition than Kyo; as a Celebrant, she desires to protect things irreplaceable to her. She cares deeply for Kyo and doesn't want him to carry too many burdens by himself. She has been recognized to be a "Witch", a Wizard with an almost telepathic link with the Gunner, and becomes the new Wizard of the Altair. Despite her talents, her data is severely damaged after her first battle. Though she is eventually restored, her apparition in the Maihama server lacks emotion as her emotional data component is trapped within the Altair, the only place where her otherwise locked data can be accessed.

 / 

Height: 168cm
Weight: 48kg
A beautiful girl who knew and loved Kyo in his past life, before he was reborn. She acts as the Wizard of the Altair Zegapain, but later becomes Chris' partner after Arque's death. She is an expert of data salvage and saved Kyo, Ryoko, Toga, and many other Celebrants. She is also referred to as "Yehl"; Shizuno Misaki was a name given to her by the previous Kyo, who recalled that name belonged to someone important to him. Shizuno generally keeps to herself and after seeing how Kyo has forged a new relationship with Ryoko, does not pursue her former relationship till the end when she realizes she still loves and wants to be with Kyo. She appears to know more about the Gards-orms than she is admitting.  In truth, Shizuno is an artificial Meta-Body who is an inserted quantum fluctuation created by the quantum servers of iAL in an act of rebellion against her father, Naga, and that she is Yehl version 4.13. The true nature of her existence was unknown, even to herself, except by Shima. "Yehl" is the creation god in Tlingit mythology while "Misaki" is the name of Kyo's little sister and "Shizuno" is the name of Kyo's mother.

The president of the Student Council at Kyo's school, but also revealed to be the commander of the Oceanus, the base of operations for Kyo, Shizuno, and other Celebrants, and the leader of Celebram. Like Shizuno, there is more to him than meets the eye and he is only one who knows the true conditions of the present world. He and Shizuno had no prior history in the Maihama server before transferring to the Oceanus. It is later revealed that Shima's apparition (thus the reason why his Celebrant icon reads "CP-041" instead of his name) is actually a clone of his true self, a revolting Gards-orm who seeks to aid humanity's resurrection but remains with the Gards-orm. As a result, the data of his apparition has a different lifespan and is suffering dry damage. Shima means "Island" in Japanese.

Originally from the Sydney server, Minato is the vice-president of the Student Council and Shima's second-in-command on board the Oceanus. She is generally cheerful and helpful towards Shima, who saved her when the Sydney server was being destroyed, but is often left out of the loop concerning Shima and Shizuno's plans.  A capable leader in her own right, she frequently commands the Oceanus in Shima's absence and is often frustrated by Kyo's hotheaded and reckless attitude, particularly as Shima takes it all in stride.  Minato's type of Celebrant icon is "CO-ADMINISTRATOR" and her surname is hidden like Shima and Yehl's. Her true name is Emma Springrain (or Springlane?). Minato means "Port" in Japanese and other vice-commanders are also named for "Port" or "Wharf".

One of Kyo's friends, a member of the Swim Club. He and Kyo haven't gotten along because Kyo broke up their old swim team and frequently ends up in fights with Kyo. They reconcile before the server is reset, an occurrence that has repeated many times for the previous Kyo.

One of Kyo's friends, a member of the Swim Club; he rejoins the Swim Club when Hayase does since he actually had forgiven Kyo, but stayed away from him because of Kawaguchi and Hayase. He later dates Mizuki until the Maihama server is reset.

One of Kyo's friends and a member of the Swim Club; he chooses to rejoin the Swim Club after accepting Kyo's apology and deciding that his desire to swim again is more important than past feelings. He has shown signs of "awakening" and awareness that the world around him is a digital illusion, but does not become a Celebrant before the Maihama server is reset. When Sin and Abyss invade the Maihama server, he reawakens to an extent where he is able to join Minato, Irie, and Kuroshio to help Shizuno stop the Deutera areas from engulfing the Earth.

A friend of Kyo and Ryoko's; he willingly participates in most of Ryoko's film projects. Like Hayase, he appeared to be in the process of "awakening" and becomes aware of the true nature of Maihama, but fails to become a Celebrant before the Maihama server is reset. When Sin and Abyss invade the Maihama server, he reawakens to the degree where he is able to help Shizuno stop the Deutera areas from engulfing the Earth with Minato, Irie, and Kuroshio.

Ryoko's friend, a member of the Theatre Club, tennis club, and the volleyball team. She initially has feelings for Hayase, but was rejected when she confessed to him at the summer festival. She later happily dates Ushio until the server is reset. Her favorite film is Last Year at Marienbad.

A member of the Student Council. He is a Celebrant and serves as an operator on the Oceanus. In the past, he was a Zegapain Gunner until his apparition data became too unstable to entangle and previously worked under Isola, whom Kuroshio admires and respects. Kuroshio, unlike many of the other Celebrants, is reluctant to give up his life as a seemingly undying apparition for a true body. He is from the Shizuoka server.

A member of the Student Council. She is a Celebrant and acts as an operator on the Oceanus. Irie was once Kuroshio's Wizard until her apparition data became to unstable to entangle. She is also from the Shizuoka server.

Kyo's science and homeroom teacher at Maihama Minami High School; Kyo frequently calls him "Kurage". He is the sponsor for the Swim Club. He later proposes to Mizusawa, but the two do not get married before the Maihama server is reset. He is probably not a normal Meta‐Body because he cannot go out of the school, and there is another apparition of him existing Shizuno's homeroom teacher. He was an engineer of the quantum technology before he became a Meta-Body.

The nurse at Kyo's school, who appears to be close to Kurashige and later accepts a marriage proposal from him. Kyo appears to go to Mizusawa when he needs advice or to discuss matters concerning school. She has noticed abnormalities with the world they live in, but has not shown any indication of awakening.

 A Celebrant and third year student at school who dated Hayase. Her Meta-Body data was severely wet damaged in the first battle of Oscar and cannot be restored, so she does not appear in the Maihama server. The server copes with her loss (since too many deaths or disappearances would look suspicious to the unawakened people within) by not allowing people to meet her face to face whenever they wish to meet her. During each period of Maihama summer on the servers, Hayase is unaware of her disappearance despite the fact he shows signs of awakening. She is finally restored to the Maihama server after the Resurrection System is installed.

 A Celebrant who recorded the real Maihama on the "last day" before all of humanity was converted into Meta-Bodies shortly before he returned to the Maihama server. Toru died in the first battle of Oscar, but the server hides the reality of his death by saying that he is too sick to come to school. Ryoko uses Toru's tape as the basis for a movie she intends to film, not knowing that her awareness of Toru's existence is an indication of her possible awakening. Because his father was a high-ranking government official, he learned beforehand that August 31 would be the day Maihama City was to be isolated.  While only mentioned during the original series, he appears in Zegapain ADP.

 A character was mentioned in passing during the original series, who appears in Zegapain ADP.

 A character was mentioned in passing during the original series, who appears in Zegapain ADP.

Celebrant

The Gunner of the Garuda. Generally calm and level-headed, Lu-Shen suspects that Shizuno knows more about the Gards-orm than she is willing to openly admit. Originally from the Shanghai server before it was corrupted, his father was the CEO of an investment company who heavily invested in iAL. While initially he has a low opinion of Kyo, Lu-Shen comes to respect Kyo's abilities and sincere desire to protect the people he loves. In Episode 24, he kisses Kyo on the cheek before his final showdown and openly reveals his love for Kyo.

May-Yen's older twin sister, one of the Garuda's Wizards who is also originally from Shanghai. In the battle of the Shanghai server, she was salvaged to the Oceanus.  She also has the limited ability to act as a Gunner for a Zegapain and done so for the Caladrius. Kyo considers her the bad-tempered one and he unwittingly upsets her when the Shanghai server is destroyed. She is devoted to Lu-Shen and has known that Lu-Shen loved Kyo even before Lu-Shen's confession. She likes Lu-Shen.

May-Yu's younger twin sister, one of the Garuda's Wizards, though she occasionally works as the Wizard for Chris after Arque's death. In the battle of the Shanghai server, she was salvaged to the Oceanus. The bespectacled sister, Kyo refers to her as the cute one, much to May-Yu's chagrin. Like May-Yu, May-Yen is devoted to Lu-Shen.  She is somewhat less experienced as a Wizard compared to May-Yu, indicated when she was training with Chris in the Hræsvelgr, but a capable pilot nevertheless.

One of the Hræsvelgr's pilots (the Gunner) and Arque's husband. He and Arque love each other dearly; Kyo has sarcastically compared them to the French film Les Amants du Pont-Neuf (The Lovers on the Bridge in English). After the destruction of the Paris server, he and Arque became freelance mercenaries; he would not regret throwing his life away and thinks more about where and for whom he sacrifices his life for. After Arque's death, he continues to care for her dog, Pieta, who was named after the pub where he first proposed to Arque. Chris and Shizuno later become partners when Ryoko becomes the Altair's new wizard. His surname, Avenir, means "Future" in French.  He is a playable character in Zegapain XOR.

One of the Hræsvelgr's pilots (Wizard) and Chris' wife. She and Shizuno became friends when the Paris server still existed. Her memory has become severely damaged and only becomes worse each time she entangles. In the end, she sacrifices herself to force the Gards-orm to retreat back to their base while leaving a trail of particles for the Celebrants on the Oceanus to track.

 The commander of the Dvaraka, a ship like the Oceanus. Chris and Arque were originally under her command until they chose to transfer to the Oceanus. She also appears to have known Shizuno before she transferred to the Oceanus because Isola comments that her comrades on board the Dvaraka wish to see Shizuno again. After Shima, she appears to hold the most authoritative power within Celebram and is respected amongst her colleagues. Isola means "island" in Italian.

The Altair's Gunner, who is under Isola's command; his personality is quite similar to Kyo's. He and Kyo meet for the first time in episode 22 and despite their clashing personalities, come to respect one another easily. Toga is the main character of Zegapain XOR, where he was salvaged by Shizuno, but like Kyo, has lost a lot of his memories.  Before he was awakened again, he lived a normal life in Maihama.

One of the Altair's Wizards under Isola's command. She is partnered with Toga Vital and also appears in Zegapain XOR. Sarah was in love with Toga before he lost his memory. Though a competent Wizard, she is referred to by some as the "god of death" because her Gunner tends to die in battle while she survives.  She appears in episode 21 and 22 of the anime.

One of the Altair's Wizards is under Isola's command who was originally rescued from a sinking warship. She is considered a genius Wizard of electric warfare and has 4 Celeb-icons. Isola notes that Meivelle would like to see Shizuno again and invites Shizuno to visit the Dvaraka when the fighting has ended. Like Sarah, Meivelle is partnered with Toga and also appears in Zegapain XOR.

One of the Altair's Wizards under Isola's command, who appears to have a crush on Toga. In Zegapain XOR, she is also partnered with Toga and appears to be responsible for his awakening after Shizuno salvages him. In the battle of the Moon server (anime episode 1), Mio unwittingly leaks the Celebrants' strategy to the Gards-orm because her Meta-Body data contains an observation program built in by the Gards-orm. The battle results in a devastating defeat and the loss of Kyo, Toga, Chris, and Arque. She appears briefly in episode 22 as Muelle's wizard, but has no speaking lines.

The Garuda's Gunner, who is under Isola's command; he also pilots the Dvaraka's Caladrius unit as Gunner. In contrast to the seemingly unlucky Sarah, Saw is considered to be "the man who survives on good fortune". Both Sarah and Meivelle have acted as his Wizard in battles. He appears in Zegapain XOR, but makes a small non-speaking cameo in episode 22 with Sarah as his Wizard.

The vice-commander of the Dvaraka and the Hræsvelgr's Gunner. Muelle appears frequently alongside Isola and appears to have a close relationship with her.  Because of wet and dry damage, he no longer enters the battlefield unless the Dvaraka is cornered. He appears in Zegapain XOR and has non-speaking cameos throughout the anime series. Muelle means "wharf" in Spanish.

The commander of the Corduax (Cordeaux?). Insel means "island" in German.

The commander of the Cagayan. In the Project Resurrection, the Cagayan was destroyed by the Coatlicue's Vanishment mode. Dao means "island" in Chinese.

The commander of the Deukalio (Deucalion?). In the Project Resurrection, the Deucalion was destroyed by the Coatlicue. Île means "island" in French.

The commander of the Rwenzori.  She makes a brief speaking appearance in the final episode as the remaining Oceanus class ships attempt to escape from the destruction of the Gards-orm's North Pole base.  Ostrova means "islands" in Russian; used as a family name, it roughly translates to "from the island" or "belonging to the island".

The commander of the Ogiges. Nisos means "island" in Greek.

AI

 One of the Oceanus class ship' AIs. He is the captain of the Oceanus and executes Shima and Minato's orders. He is the Deputy Administrator (commander) of the Oceanus class ship Popol Vuh.

 One of the Oceanus class ship' AIs. He acts as the secondary captain of the Oceanus. He can control the Caladrius as a Gunner.

 One of the Oceanus class ship' AIs. She mainly supports transferring the Zegapain, but is also responsible of monitoring interior sensors onboard Oceanus. She is destroyed when Sin infiltrates the Oceanus and reinstalled as Fosetta II. Her personality is markedly different after her installation; Fosetta II is unusually cold compared to Fosetta. She is also capable of controlling the Caladrius as a Wizard.

 One of the Oceanus class ship' AIs. She also mainly supports transferring the Zegapain and is capable of controlling the Caladrius as a Gunner or a Wizard. Ryoko nicknames her "Mi-chan" after a turtle that she had kept before.

 One of the Oceanus class ship' AIs. She is monitors and directs the management and strategic functions of the Zegapain.

 A new character introduced in Zegapain ADP.

 The programming the conveys the conditions of the Zegapain to the flight crew (Gunner and Wizard). For the three Zegapain on board the Oceanus, the Altair and the Garuda's AI respond in English while the Hræsvelgr responds in Spanish.

Gards-orm

 One of the people with "light" who are constantly launching assaults on those without "light" in Anti-Zegapain ships in order to destroy servers. Referred to as the Demon Soldier of the Gards-orm, he is almost incomprehensible to the Celebrants. He and Sin can revive themselves numerous times because once their bodies are destroyed, they can simply transfer their data and awaken in new body. He and Sin meet their end when Chris destroys all their replacement bodies and the two Gards-orm die in battle.

 Abyss' female partner, who is as strong as he is, and seems to be aware of a link between Shizuno Misaki (Yehl) and Gards-orm. Sin manages to infiltrate the Oceanus with a childlike desire to understand why the Celebrants continue to fight, specifically questioning Minato, Lu-Shen, Kyo, and Ryoko.  When Ryoko presents her an answer she particularly likes, she transfers part of her data to Ryoko to restore her apparition, though Ryoko's emotional component data remains trapped in the Altair. It is through Ryoko that Sin begins to understand what it truly means to be human, though she fails to fully grasp human values.

 The CEO of iAL Corporations, who advocated limitless human evolution through quantum servers, where humanity will live eternally. He was an Indian American.  Naga exists as the quantum computer, but is the leader of the Gards-orm who aim toward the human race's "infinite evolution". The etymology of "Naga" is a very large snake in Hinduism and Buddhism.

 Shima's original Meta-Body. He was Naga's aide and initially supported Naga's technology; he volunteered to become the first person to become a Meta-Body.  He developed the Resurrection System and Layered QL and was waiting for the Oceanus to come his server. He was an Indian Buddhist priest.

 A Gards-orm replica of Toga Vital, created from his lost character and memory data salvaged by Gards-orm. He controls the Anti-Zega Coatlicue and acts as the protagonist of Zegapain NOT.

 A Wizard for the Gards-orm, who is skilled in close range combat and appears in Zegapain NOT. While resembling Sin, Calm's serious personality is copied from the data of an unknown Celebrant suspected to be Kaminagi Ryoko.

 A test Wizard for the Gards-orm, but was assigned to the battlefield when her abilities proved to be invaluable. She is thought to be as skilled as Meivelle Transferre. Nemmon appears in Zegapain NOT.

 Taciturn and dedicated to her duty, Klarca is a Gards-orm Wizard who appears in Zegapain NOT. Klarca excels in the processing of information and reconnaissance missions.

 The Oceanus class ship Larnax's commander of Gards-orm side who appears in Zegapain NOT. He holds a deep grudge against the Celebrants and humanity. The etymology of his name likely derives from Nahusa, a king from Hindu mythology who became a snake because of a curse.

 A gunner for the Gards-orm who is harsh and righteous in character. He has trouble seeing good in the world and both resists and apparently hates Naga and the origin of the Gards-orm. He has been involved in battles against the Oceanus-class ships' fleet. He appears in Zegapain NOT.

 A gunner for the Gards-orm and a member of the Gards-orm's S.D. Elite posted at Uenomiya. She holds some antipathy for Toga Dupe, who she considers a human fake, when he is also appointed to the elite. She appears in Zegapain NOT.

Others

Ryoko's younger brother, who enjoys playing the Pain of Zega game. Because he is not a Celebrant, Shima is able to alter Koji's memories and Minato can directly control his body when they attempt to help Kyo overcome his sadness over the loss of Ryoko.

 Kyo's younger sister, a junior high school student who appears only after Kyo is able to save the Maihama server from destruction. Her name, Misaki, and their mother's, Shizuno, are likely the origin of the name the previous Kyo gives Yehl when they become partners. Misaki is apparently important to Kyo, who only recognized her name and their mother's as part of a missing memory. It is likely that she was unable to take shelter at the Maihama Minami High School and died.  Kyo's recollection of her and their family allows him to realize what he knows is a dream and what he knows is reality.

References

Zegapain